Remond Willis III (born August 28, 1985 in Lilbourn, Missouri) is a professional Canadian football/arena football defensive lineman who is currently a free agent. He has played for the Winnipeg Blue Bombers. He was signed by the Calgary Stampeders as a free agent in 2009. He played college football for the Tennessee State Tigers and the University of Illinois.

External links
Illinois Fighting Illini bio
Tennessee State Tigers bio
Calgary Stampeders bio

1985 births
Living people
People from Dexter, Missouri
American players of Canadian football
Canadian football defensive linemen
American football defensive linemen
Illinois Fighting Illini football players
Tennessee State Tigers football players
Calgary Stampeders players
Milwaukee Iron players
Saskatchewan Roughriders players
Winnipeg Blue Bombers players
Portland Thunder players